Krystian Martinek (born April 5, 1948) is a German actor, writer and director.

Martinek completed successfully his education as an actor at the Schauspielschule Bochum. After that he played various stage plays in Bochum, Salzburg and Hamburg.
He is known for his various roles in film and television. Krystian was seen in the cult-crime-drama Tatort, action-phenomenon Alarm für Cobra 11 and in a recurring role in the 80s hit-drama The Black Forest Clinic. Recently he joined the cast as Ludwig von Lahnstein in the popular soap opera Verbotene Liebe (Forbidden Love).

As a screenplay writer, he was responsible for various episodes of Das Traumhotel, Ein starkes Team and Da kommt Kalle.

Krystian Martinek lives with his wife, screenplay writer Hilly Martinek, and their children in Hamburg.

Notes

Living people
German male stage actors
German male soap opera actors
Male actors from Warsaw
1948 births
Writers from Warsaw
German male film actors
German male writers